The  represents amateur baseball in Japan. They organize Japanese amateur baseball throughout Japan and overseas. The Federation was set up after the Japan Amateur Baseball Association (JABA) and the Japan Student Baseball Association (JSBA) joined on June 20, 1990. They are the governing body for amateur baseball in Japan. In 2003, there was 160,000 people playing baseball in around 5,000 teams across Japan. As of 2015, the BFJ represents six international teams: senior, women, university, high school/18U, 15U, and a 12U team.

The Industrial League (JAPA) and Student Baseball (High School and College) had been run separately for a long time from before World War II. In 1954, they formed the Japan Amateur Baseball Federation to organize and represent a Japanese team in the first Asian Baseball Championship in the Philippines. In 1966, after participating in six Asian Baseball Championships, the Japan Amateur Baseball Federation was disbanded and reorganized into the Japan Amateur Baseball International Committee in 1967.

Beginning in 1984, baseball was being considered as an Olympic sport. After being used as a demonstration sport of the Olympic Games in Los Angeles (1984), Seoul (1988), and became a regular Olympic sport at the Barcelona games in 1992. These developments prompted the unification of the JAPA and JSBA to become one body of amateur baseball and the Baseball Federation of Japan (BFJ) on June 20, 1990. The BFJ joined the Japanese Olympic Committee, International Baseball Federation, and Baseball Federation of Asia.

Committees and organizations
As of 2015, the BFJ has four subcommittees: the National Team Commission, Umpiring Commission, Sport and Environment Commission, and Anti-Doping Commission.

It is also represented in six International Organizations: International Baseball Federation (iBAF) 1st Vice President, Baseball Federation of Asia (BFA) Vice President, iBAF Tournaments Commission, iBAF Medical/Anti-Doping Commission, iBAF Women's Development Commission, and the iBAF Athletes Commission.

Executive members
Source: BFJ

National teams

Source: BFJ

Men's

Competitions

Source: BFJ

Domestic

Senior

See also
Sports in Japan
Baseball in Japan

References

External links
Official website 

Baseball in Japan
Jap
Sports governing bodies in Japan